Ringkøbing (older spelling Ringkjøbing) is a town in Ringkøbing-Skjern Municipality in Region Midtjylland on the west coast of the Jutland peninsula in west Denmark. It has a population of 9,894 (1 January 2022).

History

Archeological finds suggest that the town was founded in the 13th century. At that time it was the only real harbour town along the Danish west coast, being sheltered from the North Sea by the wall of Holmsland Dunes (Holmsland Klit).

In the 17th century, the strait connecting Ringkøbing Fjord to the North Sea began to move south under the influence of wind and tide; soon it was no longer navigable. Ringkøbing was cut off from the sea until the beginning of the 20th century, when a new channel was built at the town of Hvide Sande, in nearby Holmsland municipality.

The name Ringkøbing means "The market town near Rindum". By the 11th century, a church had been built in the small village of Rindum. The village is probably even older. Evidence of settlements dating back as far as the 6th century has been found.

On the 27th of January in 1443, the towns' privilege of "købstad" (Danish for market town) was cemented by the Danish king Christopher of Bavaria by royal charter. The royal privilege is most likely older, dating back to king Valdemar IV Atterdag, as the document cementing the royal privilege of the town mentions the original privilege originating from the reign of "King Valdemar".

At the end of World War II, Ringkøbing was involved in the British testing of captured German V-weapons. British soldiers, including radar experts from the British Artillery Regiment, were stationed there in October 1945 to monitor the accuracy of weapons fired from a base in Cuxhaven, Lower Saxony, Germany. The tests were part of the post-WWII justice process, to establish whether the use of V-weapons constituted indiscriminate killing of civilians. In fact, they proved to be very accurate, and the Nazis escaped this charge.

Main sights
Today the centre of Ringkøbing has some quaint old streets, most of which lead towards the water of the fjord.

Ringkøbing Church was built in the early 15th century, and its tower, which is wider on top than on the bottom, was erected ca. 1550.  The church houses two organs: the oldest in the west pulpit was built by Demant & Son in 1861 with a baroque facade from 1633; the other from 1974 is by Frobenius & Sons. As the result of a restoration in 1995–1996, the church has a number of modern features, including an altarpiece by Arne Haugen Sørensen and a glass baptismal font.

Economy
Ringkjøbing Landbobank is headquartered in Ringkøbing.

Notable people 

 Niels Trolle (1599 in Ringkøbing –1667) a nobleman, vice admiral and Steward of Norway
 Stephen Hansen (1701 in Skodsbøl – 1770) an industrialist, businessman and General War Commissioner
 Wilhelm Sponneck (1815 in Ringkøbing – 1888) a nobleman (rigsgreve) and Minister of Finance
 Janus la Cour (1837 near Ringkøbing – 1909) a painter of the classical Eckersberg school
 Ludvig Mylius-Erichsen (1872 in Ringkøbing – 1907) an author and explorer of Greenland 
 Mikkel Frandsen (1892 in Sønder Lem – 1981) a Danish American physical chemist noted for experiments involving chemical thermodynamics and heavy water
 Poul Andersen (1922 in Ringkøbing – 2006) a printer, served in the Danish resistance movement during WWII and later published one of the remaining two Danish-language newspapers in the USA
 Vibeke Hastrup (1958 in Vedersø) an actress who has worked in theatre, television and film 
 Cornelia von Levetzow (1836–1921), successful novelist
 Mette Lykke (born 1981 in Ringkøbing) a Danish businesswoman, entrepreneur and investor

Sport 
 Claus Møller Jakobsen (born 1976 in Ringkøbing) a Danish former professional handballer, sports commentator for TV2
 Jacob Larsen (1979 in Egvad) a Danish cricketer  
 Hans Henrik Andreasen (born 1979 in Ringkøbing) a retired Danish footballer with over 500 club caps
 Niels Lodberg (born 1980 in Ringkøbing) is a former Danish footballer with over 350 club caps
 Jonas Borring (born 1985 in Ringkøbing) is a retired Danish footballer with over 350 club caps

Gallery

References

External links
 The Official Tourist page for Ringkøbing
 West Jutland tourism information, covering Ringkøbing area
 Municipal statistics: NetBorger Kommunefakta, delivered from KMD aka Kommunedata (Municipal Data)
 Municipal mergers and neighbors: Eniro new municipalities map
 Weather forecast Ringkøbing, Denmark weather-atlas.com

Municipal seats of the Central Denmark Region
Municipal seats of Denmark
Cities and towns in the Central Denmark Region
Former municipalities of Denmark
Ringkøbing-Skjern Municipality